Riot Runners is an Endless Arcade Runner Game for iOS and Android developed and published by UK-based game development studio Room 8. The game was released on February 13, 2014. In the game players take control of one of the robots, who started a rebellion against the evil overlords. The main goal is to run as far as possible while picking up coins and gears to set the highest score.

Gameplay
In the world of steam machines little robots are enslaved by giant mech overlords. The player must take control of one small robot worker and guide it to freedom through the long obstacle course.
The game has seven playable robots each with his own super-power.

List of playable characters:
 Rebel Jack - The first robot who dared to disobey the overlords. He is dreaming about freedom!
 Mimi Kid - A cute little buddy-robot. Yeah! Robots can be kids too!
 Speedy Ben - The fastest robot in the factory. Faster than any overlord!
 Jumper Sam - Jollier which will leave no one indifferent. He just jumps for joy!
 Greedy Mike - He wants to capture all coins in the City!
 Tesla Jim - Electric robot with Tesla-powered ignition.
 Cheater Tom - This robot can trick anyone! He always has a trump card up his tin sleeve.

The game features randomly generated environment, that grows in difficulty with the overall run distance. 
Integration with social platforms such as Facebook and Tango lets players compete with their friends on interactive leaderboards.

There is also five power-ups that allow gamers to increase their highscore:
 Boost - boosts the robot for a short period of time
 Shield - protects the robot for a short period of time, vanishes after the first crash
 Multiplier x2 - doubles the points the player gets for a short period of time
 Coins Doubler - doubles the coins received for a short period of time
 Headstart - lets the player start ahead of the enslaver

Players can upgrade the power-ups to increase the duration or length in case of the Headstart.

Awards
Riot Runners won a prize for "Best Game In Show - Audience Award" at the Indie Prize Showcase held on Casual Connect Kyiv 2013.

References

Platform games
iOS games
2014 video games